Jodhpur Park Girls' High School is a  West Bengal Board affiliated high-school situated in the Jodhpur Park area of the city of Kolkata in India. It was  established in the year 1961 by the Government of West Bengal for Girls. It, along with South Point School, Nava Nalanda High School etc. is one of the leading schools in south Kolkata, that follow the syllabus of the state education boards.

Jodhpur Park Boys' School 

A boys' division of the School named Jodhpur Park Boys School was established in 1969.

See also
Education in India
List of schools in India
Education in West Bengal

References

External links

High schools and secondary schools in West Bengal
Girls' schools in Kolkata
Educational institutions established in 1961
1961 establishments in West Bengal